is a Japanese anime entrepreneur, the co-founder and current president and CEO of Production I.G, as well as a producer for the studio.

Career
Mitsuhisa Ishikawa was executive at Bee Train from 1997 to 2006,

Ishikawa acted as executive producer for the anime sequence The Origin of Ren in Kill Bill, and was the producer of the first two Ghost in the Shell films. In 2005, Ishikawa joined his first joint Japanese-U.S. collaboration, since the opening of the Production I.G branch in Los Angeles, IGPX: Immortal Grand Prix, a joint production with Production I.G and Cartoon Network. Ishikawa has also produced Batman: Gotham Knight, Halo Legends and Dante's Inferno: An Animated Epic.

Ishikawa is also one of the owners of Tatsunoko Productions and a part-time director.

References

External links

Mitsuhisa Ishikawa Profile at Production I.G.com

 
Production I.G
Living people
Japanese anime producers
Japanese animated film producers
Japanese film producers
1958 births